The Saint Vincent Labour Party was a social democratic political party in Saint Vincent and the Grenadines from 1955 to 1994. It was the ruling party from 1967 to 1972 and again from 1974 until 1984.

History
The party was established in 1955. In the 1957 general elections it received 19.0% of the vote, putting it in second place, but failed to win a seat. In the 1961 elections the party received 47.9% of the vote and three seats, losing by only 336 votes to the ruling People's Political Party, who won nine seats. In the 1966 elections they received 50.9% of the vote, but the PPP won five seats to the Labour Party's four. However, early elections the following year saw the Labour Party increase their vote share to 53.8% and take six of the nine seats.

Despite receiving over 50% of the vote again in 1972, the elections resulted in a tie with both parties winning six seats. The sole independent candidate, James Fitz-Allen Mitchell formed a government with his former party, the PPP, and was appointed Prime Minister. However, a further set of early elections in 1974 saw the Labour Party claim 69.0% of the vote and win ten of the thirteen seats. They remained in power following the 1979 elections, but lost the 1984 elections to the New Democratic Party. In the 1989 elections the NDP won all 15 seats. The Labour Party regained two seats in the 1994 elections, and on 16 October 1994 they merged with the Movement for National Unity to form the Unity Labour Party.

Electoral history

House of Assembly elections

References 

Labour parties
Political parties disestablished in 1994
Political parties established in 1955
Political parties in Saint Vincent and the Grenadines
Socialist parties in North America
1955 establishments in the British Empire